Carlyn Elizabeth Baldwin (born March 17, 1996) is an American soccer midfielder who plays for Sporting CP.

References

External links 
 

1996 births
Living people
American women's soccer players
Sporting CP (women's football) players
Tennessee Volunteers women's soccer players
United States women's under-20 international soccer players
Women's association football midfielders